The Abernethy biscuit was invented by doctor John Abernethy in the 18th century as a digestive improver and hence aid to health.

Abernethy believed that most diseases were due to disorders in digestion. The Abernethy biscuit is a type of digestive biscuit, a baked good originally designed to be eaten as a support to proper digestion. In creating his biscuit, Abernethy was following a trend of other medical practitioners like English William Oliver of Bath, Somerset (invented the Bath Oliver) and the American preacher Sylvester Graham who was a nutrition expert (the Graham cracker).

The Abernethy biscuit is an adaptation of the plain captain's biscuit or hardtack, with the added ingredients of sugar (for energy), and caraway seeds because of their reputation for having a carminative (prevents flatulence) effect making them beneficial in digestive disorders. The biscuit is a mix between an all butter biscuit and a shortcake, raising through use of ammonium bicarbonate. According to The Oxford Companion to Food, a baker at a shop where Abernethy regularly had lunch created the new biscuit when Abernethy suggested it, naming it after him.

Abernethy biscuits are still popular in Scotland. They are manufactured commercially by Simmers (Edinburgh), The Westray Bakehouse (Orkney Islands), Walls Bakeries (Shetland Islands), and by Stag Bakeries (Isle of Lewis).

Sample ingredient list
The following are ingredients:

Plain flour
Caster sugar (granulated sugar can also be used)
Butter
Baking powder
Caraway seeds
Milk
Egg
Salt

The biscuit in history
When British statesman William Gladstone was Vice-President of the Board of Trade in the 1840s, his only luncheon consisted of an Abernethy biscuit, brought to him by his wife.

In the libretto of the comic opera Princess Toto written by W. S. Gilbert (first performance 24 June 1876) the king disguises himself as an Abernethy Biscuit.

In Charles Dickens' first novel The Pickwick Papers, the character of Mr. Solomon Pell is found, "in court, regaling himself,...., with a cold collation of an Abernethy biscuit and a saveloy".

See also 
 Bath Oliver
 Graham cracker
 Digestive biscuit

References

Goods manufactured in Scotland
Scottish desserts
Biscuits
Victorian cuisine
Types of food
Scottish cuisine